The 2016 CONCACAF Girls' U-15 Championship was an association football tournament that took take place in Bay Lake, Florida during August 2016.

Teams

Venezuela are an invitee.

Venues

All matches will take place at the ESPN Wide World of Sports Complex in Bay Lake, Florida, near Orlando City.

Group stage

Tiebreakers

The following tiebreaking criteria were established by CONCACAF:
Greatest number of points obtained in all group matches
Goal difference in all group matches
Greatest number of goals scored in all group matches
Greatest number of points obtained in matches amongst teams still tied
Lots drawn by the Organizing Committee

Group A

Group B

Group C

Group D

Group E

Knockout stage

Quarter-finals

Semi-finals

Third-place playoff

Final

Goalscorers
In total, 261 goals were scored in 50 games.

8 goals

 Jordyn Huitema
 Alison González
 Natalia Mauleón
 Payton Linnehan
 Gabrielle Robinson

7 goals

 Mia Fishel
 Kalyssa Van Zanten

6 goals

 LeiLanni Nesbeth
 Sydney Kennedy
 María Luisa Colón
 Samantha Meza

5 goals

 Teni Akindoju
 María Paula Salas
 Lindsey Hart
 Nicole Pérez
 Sunshine Fontes

4 goals

 Tiana Sealy
 Jayde Riviere
 Lesly Calderón
 Alejandra Díaz
 Yarelis Maldonado
 Isabelle Rivera

3 goals

 Priscila Chinchilla
 Nicole Gómez
 Melchie Dumonay
 Ashly Martínez
 Anette Vázquez
 Aaliyah Prince

2 goals

 Tyra McKenzie
 Marissa King
 Caitlin Padmore
 Adia Gibbons
 Maya Ladhani
 Carmen Marín
 Jathsury Rosa
 Staygin Stephens
 Riesmarly Tokaay
 Ximena Ríos
 Yorcelly Humphreys
 Gabriela Torres
 Britanya St. Prix
 Croix Bethune
 Madison Mercado

1 goal

 Zolique Samuel
 Abigail Simms
 Gabrielle Simms
 Mickell Yallop
 Rowland Kirton-Browne
 Asha Stevenson
 Nia Christopher
 Mya Jones
 Lara Kazandjian
 Julia Kostecki
 Aaliyah Scott
 Olivia Scott
 Caitlin Shaw
 Julianne Vallerand
 Arthmeis Deslandes-Hydes
 Daniella Gourzong
 Sabrina Suberan
 Maggi Segovia
 Britney Charles
 Cassie Rennie
 Angeline Gustave
 Sheelove Joseph
 Spice Clarke
 Shannia Harris
 Giselle Washington
 Fátima Arellano
 Aislinn García
 Karen Gómez
 Esmeralda Zamarrón
 Dayana Calero
 Rocio Pérez
 Thalia Pérez
 Carolina Vázquez
 Tanika Bernard
 Geen Henry
 Tessa Jones
 Krysan St. Louis
 Arriel Delplache
 Annika Daniel
 Talia DellaPeruta
 Hollyn Torres
 María Cazorla
 Kelsy Rondón

Own goals

 Lala Romney (against Barbados)
 (against Saint Lucia)
 (against Mexico)
 (against United States)
 (against United States)

Teams with unaccounted goals

 2 goals (against U.S. Virgin Islands)
 1 goal (against Bermuda)
 4 goals (against Antigua and Barbuda)
 3 goals (against Bahamas)
 2 goals (against Venezuela)
 1 goal (against Barbados)
 5 goals (against Dominican Republic)
 1 goal (against Saint Lucia)
 3 goals (against Saint Vincent and Grenadines)
 4 goals (against El Salvador)
 2 goals (against Saint Vincent and Grenadines)
 2 goals (against Grenada)
 5 goals (against Grenada)
 1 goal (against Puerto Rico)
 1 goal (against Costa Rica)

Player awards
The Technical Study Group announced the tournament's Best XI and awards following the final.

Best XI

Player of the Tournament (Golden Ball)
 Mia Fishel
Golden Boot
 Payton Linnehan (8 goals)
Golden Glove
 Ruth Jones
Fair Play Award

Rosters

The rosters were published on August 9, 2016.

References
Notes

External links
 

2016
Girls' U-15 Championship
2016 in women's association football
International association football competitions hosted by the United States